Kuyeda is the name of two rural localities in Kuyedinsky District of Perm Krai, Russia:
Kuyeda (settlement), a settlement
Kuyeda (village), a village